Guatemala has been independent from Spain since 1847. The first adhesive stamps of Guatemala were revenue stamps issued in 1868. The first postage stamps were produced in 1871.

See also
Revenue stamps of Guatemala
1868-1900 Stamps of Guatemala on Wikimedia Commons

References

Further reading
Andrews, James C. (1994) Guatemalan Telegraph Stamps & Stationery. Detroit: International Society of Guatemala Collectors.  (A corrected version of the 1993 original of the same title.)

External links

Asociacion Filatelica de Guatemala
International Society of Guatemala Collectors (ISGC) web site
Online exhibition of the first four Guatemala issues

 
Guatemala